The Dissident is a 2020 American documentary film directed and produced by Bryan Fogel. It follows the assassination of Jamal Khashoggi and Saudi Arabia's effort to control international dissent.
 
The film had its world premiere at the Sundance Film Festival on January 24, 2020. It was released in a limited release on December 25, 2020, followed by video on demand on January 8, 2021, by Briarcliff Entertainment.

Synopsis
The film follows the assassination of Jamal Khashoggi and Saudi Arabia's effort to control international dissent. Central to the documentary is the story of the Saudi activist and video blogger, Omar Abdulaziz.

According to Bryan Fogel, the movie’s aim is to look “deeply into Khashoggi's murder and the ramifications of it.” While a CIA report released by the Biden administration implicated Saudi crown prince Mohammed bin Salman in the death of Khashoggi, Fogel believes the prince will never face an Interpol arrest warrant or formal investigation considering the vast amount of wealth he owns.

Release
The film had its world premiere at the Sundance Film Festival on January 24, 2020. In September 2020, Briarcliff Entertainment acquired distribution rights to the film. It was released in a limited release on December 25, 2020, followed by video on demand on January 8, 2021.

The film struggled to find a distributor for eight months and was not able to run on a large streaming platform like Netflix or Amazon Prime Video. It is widely believed this was due to those platforms' fear of offending the Saudi Arabian government and possibly losing subscribers.

Fogel showed disappointment at The Washington Post owner Jeff Bezos’ decision to acquire UAE e-commerce site Souq.com shortly after he refused to release The Dissident on Amazon Prime Video.

Reception

VOD sales 
In its first weekend of home release, the film was the third-most rented title at the iTunes Store and eighth on Apple TV.

Critical response 
The website's critics consensus reads, "The Dissident offers little catharsis in its unflinching look at a grisly murder—and gives no quarter in its forceful reminder of the fragility of free speech." On Metacritic, the film has a weighted average score of 82 out of 100, based on 15 critics, indicating "universal acclaim".

Jordan Hoffman of Screen International gave the film a positive review, writing: "The Dissident holds few new revelations but presents its case with enough infuriating evidence and storytelling power to make it worthwhile. Todd McCarthy of The Hollywood Reporter wrote "Fogel's investigation is vigorous, deep and comprehensive." Owen Gleiberman, reviewing the film in Variety, called it "an eye-opening thriller brew of corruption, cover-up, and real-world courage."

Joseph Fahima of Middle East Eye gave the documentary a negative review, qualifying it as an "over-polished piece, which intentionally omits the less flattering aspects of [Khashoggi] story to deliver a more marketable product" and criticizing that the "theatrical tone prioritises atmosphere, emotional engagement, and mundane cinematic flourishes over well-rounded truth".

Alleged manipulation 
The filmmakers told The Washington Post that they believed trolls operating on behalf of the Saudi government created a false sense of popular disapproval of the film by flooding the review sites Rotten Tomatoes and IMDb. Tiyson Reynolds from Rotten Tomatoes said "Based on recent analysis, it appears that there have been deliberate attempts to manipulate the movie's audience score".

Accolades

See also
Death of a Princess, a 1980 British drama-documentary protested by the Saudi government

References

External links
 
 
 

2020 films
2020 documentary films
American documentary films
Documentary films about organized crime
Documentary films about death
Documentary films about journalism
2020s English-language films
2020s American films